Downtown Selma Historic District is a national historic district located at Selma, Johnston County, North Carolina.  It encompasses 59 contributing buildings and 1 contributing structures in the central business district of Selma.  It includes notable examples of Classical Revival, Colonial Revival, Art Moderne, Art Deco, and Gothic Revival style architecture and buildings dating from about 1875 to 1960. Notable buildings include the Bank of Selma/American Telephone and Telegraph Exchange Building (1912; 1985), Economy Furniture (c. 1920), John A. Mitchener Building (1925), The Rudy Theater (c. 1940; c. 1970), The Hardware Store (c. 1910), Bank of Selma (c. 1910), Selma Baptist Church (1908; 1948), and Selma Manufacturing Company/Selma Furniture Store and Opera House (1902).

It was listed on the National Register of Historic Places in 2010.

References

Historic districts on the National Register of Historic Places in North Carolina
Neoclassical architecture in North Carolina
Colonial Revival architecture in North Carolina
Art Deco architecture in North Carolina
Gothic Revival architecture in North Carolina
Buildings and structures in Johnston County, North Carolina
National Register of Historic Places in Johnston County, North Carolina